Tenuidactylus caspius, also known as the Caspian bent-toed gecko or Caspian thin-toed gecko, is a species of gecko that ranges widely from southwestern Kazakhstan, southern Tajikistan, Turkmenistan and Uzbekistan west to southern Russia, Georgia, Armenia and Azerbaijan, south to Iran and northern Afghanistan.

References 

Tenuidactylus
Reptiles described in 1831